Lonchodes femoralis, is a species of phasmid or stick insect  found in Sri Lanka.

References

Phasmatodea
Insects of Asia
Insects described in 1907